Bernières is a commune in the Seine-Maritime department in the Normandy region in northern France.

Geography
The A29 autoroute forms the commune's southern border.

Population

Places of interest
 The church of St.Jean-Baptiste, dating from the nineteenth century.
 A manorhouse
 The chateau of Durdan.

See also
Communes of the Seine-Maritime department

References

Communes of Seine-Maritime